The South African Railways Class B 0-6-4T of 1893 was a steam locomotive from the pre-Union era in Transvaal.

Between 1893 and 1898, 175 Class B  tank engines were placed in service by the Nederlandsche-Zuid-Afrikaansche Spoorweg-Maatschappij in the Zuid-Afrikaansche Republiek.

In 1899, twenty more were ordered, of which only two were delivered by the time the Imperial Military Railways took over all railway operations in the two Boer Republics during the Second Boer War. The other eighteen locomotives in this order were intercepted by the Imperial Military Railways, who diverted two of them to Lourenço Marques.

At the end of the war, the survivors of these locomotives were taken onto the roster of the Central South African Railways, renumbered and designated Class B, while the two in Mozambique were taken onto the roster of the Caminhos de Ferro de Mocambique. In 1912, when the remaining locomotives were assimilated into the South African Railways, they were renumbered again, but retained their Class B designation.

Forerunners
In 1891, the Nederlandsche-Zuid-Afrikaansche Spoorweg-Maatschappij (NZASM, often shortened to ZASM) of the Zuid-Afrikaansche Republiek (ZAR) placed an order with Emil Kessler's firm, the Maschinenfabrik Esslingen in Germany, for twenty 40 Tonner  tank steam locomotives. While these locomotives were satisfactory in service, the trailing wheels initially proved troublesome owing to insufficient sideways freedom of movement when traversing sharp curves.

Manufacturers
Because of the resultant increase in weight, these locomotives became known as the 46 Tonners.

The first twenty of these engines were delivered between 1893 and 1894 and numbered in the range from 61 to 80. They were followed by another 155 locomotives from the same manufacturer between 1894 and 1898, delivered in nine more batches and numbered in the range from 81 to 235.

In 1899, a further order for another twenty 46 Tonners was placed with the Nederlandse Fabriek van Werktuigen en Spoorwegmaterieel (Werkspoor) in the Netherlands. They were to have been numbered in the range from 236 to 255, following on the last of the Esslingen locomotives, but since delivery only commenced just before the outbreak of the Second Boer War, only numbers 236 and 237 actually entered service on the NZASM.

The remainder were intercepted by the Imperial Military Railways (IMR) who took over the operation of the Oranje-Vrijstaat Gouwerment-Spoorwegen (OVGS) and the NZASM on behalf of the invading British forces as possession was obtained of their railway lines. Sixteen of these engines were landed and erected at East London. The IMR diverted the other two to the Caminhos de Ferro de Mocambique (CFM) in Lourenço Marques.

Characteristics
Like their predecessor 40 Tonners, the 46 Tonners had Heusinger valve gear, outside plate frames and used saturated steam. The original design of the 46 Tonner called for a straight-backed coal bunker, but the last sixteen Esslingen-built and the twenty Werkspoor-built locomotives had bunkers that sloped outwards towards the top at the back, which increased the coal capacity by 20%. Their water tanks were also enlarged to a 10% larger capacity.

In service, difficulty was experienced with the trailing bogie wheels fouling the firebox and the heads of stays and rivets. This was partially overcome by fitting stops to the engine frame, but this restriction of the sideways movement of the bogie wheels resulted in derailments in tight curves such as on diverging points. The engines performed well at relatively low speeds, but were prone to serious lateral oscillations at higher speeds. Cases of derailment on straight track at speed demonstrated the limitations of a design where there was no leading carrying wheel to stabilise the engine and considerable overhang of the cylinders.

Service

NZASM
In NZASM service, all the Esslingen-built 46 Tonners were given names as well as engine numbers. The names are listed in Table 1.

The 46 Tonners became the standard mainline locomotives of the NZASM and were used on all kinds of traffic between Pretoria in the ZAR and Lourenço Marques in Mozambique. Since they did not have a leading bogie, they were found to be rough-riding and it became the practice to run them bunker forward whenever possible. The trailing bogie had a steadying effect on the locomotive when leading and the crew was not shaken up as much.

On 10 October 1895, on ZAR President Paul Kruger's birthday, 46 Tonner no. 104 Van Rensburg hauled the NZASM train to the last bolt ceremony at Heidelberg, Transvaal, where the Transvaal and Natal mainlines were linked up.

Pretoria-Pietersburg Railway
One of the locomotives, no. 64 Prinsloo, was leased or sold to the Pretoria-Pietersburg Railway (PPR) c. 1897. It retained both the NZASM number and name on the PPR.

Caminhos de Ferro de Moçambique
Between 1897 and 1898, some of the NZASM 46 Tonner locomotives were sold to the CFM. The CFM eventually had at least thirty 46 Tonners in service. The two locomotives which were delivered after the outbreak of the war and which were diverted to Lourenço Marques upon arrival, IMR numbers 249 and 250, were also taken onto the CFM roster at the end of the war. Between 1907 and 1920, during the Central South African Railways (CSAR) and South African Railways (SAR) eras, six more 46 Tonners were sold to the CFM.

Imperial Military Railways
All the NZASM 46 Tonners, as well as sixteen of the eighteen locomotives which were not delivered to the NZASM as a result of the outbreak of the war, were taken onto the roster of the IMR when it took over all railway operations in the ZAR during the war. It would appear that the locomotives were not renumbered in IMR service.

Central South African Railways
Hostilities ceased on 1 June 1902. On 1 July 1902, when the IMR was transferred to civilian control, the survivors of the NZASM 46 Tonners were taken onto the CSAR roster. They were designated Class B and renumbered by the CSAR, but records of the renumbering details are scant. The available information on NZASM-to-CSAR renumbering only covers those locomotives which the CSAR had sold to the CFM between 1907 and 1910, as shown in Table 1 and included in Table 2.

Several alterations were made to the locomotives by the IMR and CSAR. The original crank webs had solid crank-pin collars. New crank webs were fitted, which enabled solid bushed connecting and coupling rods to be fitted in place of the original split brass type. The original unbalanced slide valves were replaced with balanced slide valves.

The builders, works numbers, names, original engine numbers and known renumbering onto the rosters of the CFM, CSAR and SAR are listed in the table. The known CFM engine numbers are in the range from 20 to 49, but since the CFM locomotives were probably allocated CFM numbers in the order in which they were acquired, most of the actual CFM engine numbers are not known with the exception of NZASM no. 229  Simon Turver which definitely became CFM no. 26.
{| class="wikitable collapsible collapsed sortable" style="margin:0.5em auto; font-size:100%;"
|+46 Tonner 0-6-4T builders, works numbers, years in service, names and IMR, CSAR and SAR renumbering'|-
!Builder
!Worksno.
!YearBuilt
!Name
!NZASMno.
!IMRno.
!CSARno.
!SARno.
!Disposal
|-
|Esslingen
|2598
|1894
|Roos
|61
|61
|61
|
|
|-
|Esslingen
|2599
|1894
|Botha
|62
|62
|62
|
|Scrapped 1909
|-
|Esslingen
|2600
|1894
|Cronje
|63
|63
|63
|
|Withdrawn pre-1907
|-
|Esslingen
|2601
|1894
|Prinsloo
|64
|64
|64
|
|Scrapped 1909
|-
|Esslingen
|2602
|1894
|Malan
|65
|65
|65
|
|
|-
|Esslingen
|2603
|1894
|Stoop
|66
|66
|66
|
|
|-
|Esslingen
|2604
|1894
|Greyling
|67
|67
|67
|
|
|-
|Esslingen
|2605
|1894
|Grobler
|68
|68
|68
|
|Scrapped 1909
|-
|Esslingen
|2606
|1894
|Van Staden
|69
|69
|69
|
|
|-
|Esslingen
|2607
|1895
|Beukes
|70
|70 
|70
|
|Scrapped 1909
|-
|Esslingen
|2608
|1894
|Meyer
|71
|71
|71
|
|Scrapped 1909
|-
|Esslingen
|2609
|1894
|Steenkamp
|72
|72
|72
|
|Scrapped 1909
|-
|Esslingen
|2610
|1894
|De la Rey
|73
|73
|73
|
|
|-
|Esslingen
|2611
|1894
|Du Plessis de Bec
|74
|74
|74
|
|
|-
|Esslingen
|2612
|1894
|Celliers
|75
|75
|
|
|CFM 1897
|-
|Esslingen
|2613
|1894
|De Clercq
|76
|76
|76
|
|Scrapped 1909
|-
|Esslingen
|2614
|1894
|Bezuidenhout
|77
|77
|77
|
|Withdrawn pre-1907
|-
|Esslingen
|2615
|1894
|Spies
|78
|78
|78
|
|
|-
|Esslingen
|2616
|1894
|Labuschagne
|79
|79
|79
|
|
|-
|Esslingen
|2617
|1894
|De Jager
|80
|80
|80
|1
|
|-
|Esslingen
|2624
|1894
|Regborn Smitt
|81
|81
|81
|
|
|-
|Esslingen
|2625
|1894
|Machado
|82
|82
|
|
|CFM 1897
|-
|Esslingen
|2626
|1894
|Verloop
|83
|83
|83
|
|Withdrawn pre-1907
|-
|Esslingen
|2627
|1894
|Kock
|84
|84
|84
|
|
|-
|Esslingen
|2628
|1894
|Malherbe
|85
|85
|85
|
|
|-
|Esslingen
|2629
|1894
|Van Niekerk
|86
|86
|86
|
|
|-
|Esslingen
|2630
|1894
|Erasmus
|87
|87
|87
|
|
|-
|Esslingen
|2631
|1894
|De Wet
|88
|88
|88
|
|
|-
|Esslingen
|2632
|1894
|Boshoff
|89
|89
|89
|
|Withdrawn pre-1907
|-
|Esslingen
|2633
|1895
|Le Roux
|90
|90
|90
|
|Scrapped 1909
|-
|Esslingen
|2656
|1895
|Holland
|91
|91
|91
|
|
|-
|Esslingen
|2657
|1895
|Portugal
|92
|92
|92
|
|Scrapped 1909
|-
|Esslingen
|2658
|1895
|Schutte
|93
|93
|
|
|CFM 1897
|-
|Esslingen
|2659
|1895
|Fourie
|94
|94
|94
|
|Scrapped 1909
|-
|Esslingen
|2660
|1895
|Otto
|95
|95
|95
|
|Scrapped 1909
|-
|Esslingen
|2661
|1895
|Tosen
|96
|96
|96
|
|Scrapped 1909
|-
|Esslingen
|2662
|1895
|Jooste
|97
|97
|97
|
|
|-
|Esslingen
|2663
|1895
|Uys
|98
|98
|98
|
|Scrapped 1909
|-
|Esslingen
|2664
|1895
|Komaas
|99
|99 
|
|
|CFM 1897
|-
|Esslingen
|2665
|1895
|Kirsten
|100
|100
|100
|
|
|-
|Esslingen
|2703
|1895
|Bodenstein
|101
|101
|101
|
|
|-
|Esslingen
|2704
|1895
|Kotze
|102
|102
|102
|
|Scrapped 1909
|-
|Esslingen
|2705
|1895
|Birkenstock
|103
|103
|103
|
|
|-
|Esslingen
|2706
|1895
|Van Rensburg
|104
|104
|104
|
|Withdrawn pre-1907
|-
|Esslingen
|2707
|1895
|Schoeman
|105
|105
|105
|
|Scrapped 1909
|-
|Esslingen
|2708
|1895
|Van der Stel
|106
|106
|106
|
|Sold 1909-09
|-
|Esslingen
|2709
|1895
|De Graaff
|107
|107
|107
|
|Scrapped 1909
|-
|Esslingen
|2710
|1895
|Petersen
|108
|108
|108
|
|
|-
|Esslingen
|2711
|1895
|Oranje Vrystaat
|109
|109
|109
|
|
|-
|Esslingen
|2712
|1895
|Koningin Wilhelmina
|110
|110
|110
|
|Scrapped 1909
|-
|Esslingen
|2714
|1895
|Koningin Emma
|111
|111
|111
|
|
|-
|Esslingen
|2715
|1895
|Zacharias Wagenbouw
|112
|112
|112
|
|
|-
|Esslingen
|2716
|1895
|Van Quarlberg
|113
|113
|
|
|CFM 1897
|-
|-
|Esslingen
|2717
|1895
|Jacob Bronkhorst
|114
|114
|114
|
|
|-
|Esslingen
|2718
|1895
|Pieter Hackins
|115
|115
|115
|
|Scrapped 1909
|-
|Esslingen
|2719
|1895
|Isbrand Grosse
|116
|116
|116
|
|
|-
|Esslingen
|2720
|1895
|Johann Bax
|117
|117 
|117
|
|Withdrawn pre-1907
|-
|Esslingen
|2721
|1896
|J.C. d'Ableing
|118
|118
|118
|
|Scrapped 1909
|-
|Esslingen
|2722
|1896
|Van Assenburgh
|119
|119
|119
|
|
|-
|Esslingen
|2723
|1896
|Willem Hellot
|120
|120 
|120
|
|Withdrawn pre-1907
|-
|Esslingen
|2724
|1896
|Pasques de Chavonnes
|121
|121
|121
|
|Scrapped 1908
|-
|Esslingen
|2725
|1896
|De la Fontaine
|122
|122
|122
|2
|
|-
|Esslingen
|2726
|1896
|P.G. Noodt
|123
|123
|123
|3
|
|-
|Esslingen
|2727
|1896
|A. van Kervel
|124
|124
|124
|
|
|-
|Esslingen
|2728
|1896
|D. van der Heughel
|125
|125
|125
|
|
|-
|Esslingen
|2729
|1896
|H. Swellengrebel
|126
|126
|126
|4
|
|-
|Esslingen
|2730
|1896
|Ryk Tulbach
|127
|127
|127
|
|
|-
|Esslingen
|2731
|1896
|J. van Plettenberg
|128
|128
|128
|
|
|-
|Esslingen
|2732
|1896
|C.J. van Graaf
|129
|129
|129
|
|
|-
|Esslingen
|2733
|1896
|J.W. Janssens
|130
|130
|130
|
|
|-
|Esslingen
|2745
|1896
|Argus
|131
|131
|131
|
|
|-
|Esslingen
|2746
|1896
|Brutus
|132
|132
|132
|
|
|-
|Esslingen
|2747
|1896
|Ceres
|133
|133
|133
|
|
|-
|Esslingen
|2748
|1896
|Diana
|134
|134
|134
|
|
|-
|Esslingen
|2749
|1896
|Etna
|135
|135
|135
|
|
|-
|Esslingen
|2750
|1896
|Flora
|136
|136
|136
|
|
|-
|Esslingen
|2751
|1896
|Glorie
|137
|137
|137
|5
|
|-
|Esslingen
|2752
|1896
|Hecla
|138
|138
|138
|
|Scrapped 1909
|-
|Esslingen
|2753
|1896
|Juno
|139
|139 
|
|
|Sold 1897
|-
|Esslingen
|2754
|1896
|Komet
|140
|140
|140
|
|
|-
|Esslingen
|2755
|1896
|Leda
|141
|141
|141
|
|Withdrawn pre-1907
|-
|Esslingen
|2756
|1896
|Mars
|142
|142
|142
|
|Scrapped 1909
|-
|Esslingen
|2757
|1896
|Nero
|143
|143
|143
|
|Scrapped 1909
|-
|Esslingen
|2758
|1896
|Orion
|144
|144
|144
|
|Scrapped 1909
|-
|Esslingen
|2759
|1896
|Pluto
|145
|145
|145
|
|Scrapped 1909
|-
|Esslingen
|2760
|1896
|Rhea
|146
|146
|146
|
|
|-
|Esslingen
|2761
|1896
|Sirius
|147
|147
|147
|
|CFM 1905
|-
|Esslingen
|2762
|1896
|Triton
|148
|148
|148
|
|
|-
|Esslingen
|2763
|1896
|Urania
|149
|149
|149
|27
|
|-
|Esslingen
|2764
|1896
|Vesta
|150
|150
|150
|
|
|-
|Esslingen
|2765
|1896
|Castor
|151
|151
|151
|28
|
|-
|Esslingen
|2766
|1896
|Pollux
|152
|152
|152
|
|Scrapped 1909
|-
|Esslingen
|2767
|1896
|Ajax
|153
|153
|153
|
|Scrapped 1909
|-
|Esslingen
|2768
|1896
|Bellona
|154
|154
|154
|
|
|-
|Esslingen
|2769
|1896
|Cyclops
|155
|155
|155
|
|
|-
|Esslingen
|2770
|1896
|Delios
|156
|156
|156
|
|Sold 1909-09
|-
|Esslingen
|2771
|1896
|Eris
|157
|157
|157
|6
|
|-
|Esslingen
|2772
|1896
|Faunus
|158
|158
|158
|
|Scrapped 1909
|-
|Esslingen
|2773
|1896
|Glaucus
|159
|159
|159
|7
|
|-
|Esslingen
|2774
|1896
|Hector
|160
|160
|160
|8
|
|-
|Esslingen
|2775
|1896
|Irene
|161
|161
|161
|
|CFM 1905
|-
|Esslingen
|2776
|1896
|Jason
|162
|162
|162
|
|Sold 1909-09
|-
|Esslingen
|2777
|1896
|Kratos
|163
|163
|163
|
|
|-
|Esslingen
|2778
|1896
|Lucifer
|164
|164
|164
|9
|
|-
|Esslingen
|2779
|1896
|Medusa
|165
|165
|165
|
|
|-
|Esslingen
|2780
|1896
|Neptunus
|166
|166
|166
|
|
|-
|Esslingen
|2781
|1896
|Orrestus
|167
|167
|167
|
|Scrapped 1909
|-
|Esslingen
|2782
|1896
|Pallus
|168
|168
|168
|
|
|-
|Esslingen
|2783
|1896
|Rhesus
|169
|169
|169
|
|Scrapped 1909
|-
|Esslingen
|2784
|1896
|Styx
|170
|170 
|170
|
|Sold 1905-12
|-
|Esslingen
|2785
|1896
|Thetis
|171
|171
|171
|10
|
|-
|Esslingen
|2786
|1896
|Ulysses
|172
|172
|172
|
|Scrapped 1909
|-
|Esslingen
|2787
|1896
|Volcanus
|173
|173
|173
|
|
|-
|Esslingen
|2788
|1896
|Wodan
|174
|174
|174
|11
|
|-
|Esslingen
|2789
|1896
|Xenios
|175
|175
|175
|
|
|-
|Esslingen
|2824
|1896
|Vondel
|176
|176
|176
|12
|
|-
|Esslingen
|2825
|1897
|Willem de Zogger
|177
|177
|177
|29
|
|-
|Esslingen
|2826
|1897
|Egmond
|178
|178
|178
|
|
|-
|Esslingen
|2827
|1897
|Hoorne
|179
|179
|179
|30
|
|-
|Esslingen
|2828
|1897
|Brederode
|180
|180
|180
|31
|
|-
|Esslingen
|2829
|1897
|Julius Caesar
|181
|181
|
|
|CFM 1897
|-
|Esslingen
|2830
|1897
|Claudius Civilis
|182
|182
|182
|33
|
|-
|Esslingen
|2831
|1897
|Stephenson
|183
|183
|183
|34
|
|-
|Esslingen
|2832
|1897
|James Watt
|184
|184
|
|
|CFM 1897
|-
|Esslingen
|2833
|1897
|Boerhaare
|185
|185
|185
|36
|
|-
|Esslingen
|2834
|1897
|Pasteur
|186
|186
|186
|
|
|-
|Esslingen
|2835
|1897
|Rembrandt
|187
|187
|
|
|CFM 1897
|-
|Esslingen
|2836
|1897
|Jan Steen
|188
|188
|188
|37
|
|-
|Esslingen
|2837
|1897
|Rubens
|189
|189
|189
|
|
|-
|Esslingen
|2838
|1897
|Tromp
|190
|190
|190
|38
|
|-
|Esslingen
|2839
|1897
|De Ruyter
|191
|191
|191
|
|
|-
|Esslingen
|2840
|1897
|Van Brakel
|192
|192
|192
|39
|
|-
|Esslingen
|2841
|1897
|Jan Pieterszkoen
|193
|193
|193
|
|Scrapped 1909
|-
|Esslingen
|2842
|1897
|Van Gaalen
|194
|194
|194
|
|Sold 1909-04
|-
|Esslingen
|2843
|1897
|Evensen
|195
|195 
|
|
|CFM 1897
|-
|Esslingen
|2854
|1897
|Eendracht
|196
|196
|196
|40
|
|-
|Esslingen
|2855
|1897
|Kracht
|197
|197
|197
|41
|
|-
|Esslingen
|2856
|1897
|Veiligheid
|198
|198
|198
|42
|
|-
|Esslingen
|2857
|1897
|Wysheid
|199
|199
|40
|13
|
|-
|Esslingen
|2858
|1897
|Wetenschap
|200
|200 
|195
|
|
|-
|Esslingen
|2859
|1897
|Welvaart
|201
|201
|187
|
|CFM 1905
|-
|Esslingen
|2860
|1897
|Postwezen
|202
|202
|184
|35
|
|-
|Esslingen
|2861
|1897
|Telegrafie
|203
|203
|181
|32
|
|-
|Esslingen
|2862
|1897
|Onderwys
|204
|204
|139
|26
|
|-
|Esslingen
|2863
|1897
|Nyverheid
|205
|205 
|113
|
|CFM 1905
|-
|Esslingen
|2864
|1897
|Landbouw
|206
|206 
|99
|
|CFM 1905
|-
|Esslingen
|2865
|1897
|Veeteelt
|207
|207
|93
|25
|
|-
|Esslingen
|2866
|1897
|Mynwezen
|208
|208
|82
|24
|
|-
|Esslingen
|2867
|1897
|Europa
|209
|209
|75
|23
|
|-
|Esslingen
|2868
|1897
|Azie
|210
|210 
|60
|
|
|-
|Esslingen
|2869
|1897
|Amerika
|211
|211 
|59
|
|CFM 1897 or 1905
|-
|Esslingen
|2870
|1897
|Afrika
|212
|212
|58
|22
|
|-
|Esslingen
|2871
|1897
|Australien
|213
|213 
|57
|
|Withdrawn pre-1907
|-
|Esslingen
|2872
|1897
|President Reitz
|214
|214
|56
|21
|
|-
|Esslingen
|2873
|1897
|President Steyn
|215
|215
|55
|20
|
|-
|Esslingen
|2877
|1897
|Beelaerts van Blockland
|216
|216
|54
|19
|
|-
|Esslingen
|2878
|1897
|Cornelis Hontmann
|217
|217
|53
|18
|
|-
|Esslingen
|2879
|1897
|Paulus van Caerden
|218
|218
|52
|17
|
|-
|Esslingen
|2880
|1897
|Joris van Spilbergen
|219
|219
|51
|16
|
|-
|Esslingen
|2881
|1897
|Pieter Both
|220
|220 
|50
|
|CFM 1905
|-
|Esslingen
|2882
|1897
|Isac le Maire
|221
|221
|49
|
|
|-
|Esslingen
|2883
|1897
|Leendert Jansz
|222
|222 
|48
|
|Sold 1909-07
|-
|Esslingen
|2884
|1897
|Nicolaus Proot
|223
|223 
|
|
|Diverted 1898
|-
|Esslingen
|2885
|1897
|David Cominck
|224
|224
|47
|15
|
|-
|Esslingen
|2886
|1897
|Hendrik Boom
|225
|225
|46
|14
|
|-
|Esslingen
|2941
|1897
|Annetjie Boom
|226
|226
|
|
|CFM 1897
|-
|Esslingen
|2942
|1897
|Sebastiaan van Opdorp
|227
|227
|
|
|CFM 1897
|-
|Esslingen
|2943
|1897
|Elisabeth van Opdorp
|228
|228
|
|
|CFM 1897
|-
|Esslingen
|2944
|1898
|Simon Turver
|229
|229
|
|
|CFM 1897 (No. 26)
|-
|Esslingen
|2945
|1898
|Jan Wintervogel
|230
|230 
|45
|44
|Or ex IMR 231
|-
|Esslingen
|2946
|1898
|Stephen Botma
|231
|231 
|44
|
|Or ex IMR 230
|-
|Esslingen
|2947
|1898
|Jan van Harvarden
|232
|232
|43
|
|
|-
|Esslingen
|2948
|1898
|Wouter Mostert
|233
|233
|42
|43
|
|-
|Esslingen
|2949
|1898
|Rijklof van Goens
|234
|234 
|41
|
|Withdrawn pre-1907
|-
|Esslingen
|2950
|1898
|Roelof de Man
|235
|235 
|
|
|Diverted 1898
|-
|Werkspoor
|1
|1899
|
|236
|236
|39
|47
|
|-
|Werkspoor
|2
|1899
|
|237
|237
|38
|46
|
|-
|Werkspoor
|3
|1899
|
|
|238
|37
|
|
|-
|Werkspoor
|4
|1899
|
|
|239
|36
|45
|
|-
|Werkspoor
|5
|1901
|
|
|240
|35
|55
|
|-
|Werkspoor
|6
|1901
|
|
|241
|34
|54
|
|-
|Werkspoor
|7
|1901
|
|
|242
|33
|53
|
|-
|Werkspoor
|8
|1901
|
|
|243
|31
|52
|
|-
|Werkspoor
|9
|1901
|
|
|244
|30
|51
|
|-
|Werkspoor
|10
|1901
|
|
|245
|29
|50
|
|-
|Werkspoor
|29
|1901
|
|
|246 
|32
|
|Withdrawn pre-1907
|-
|Werkspoor
|30
|1901
|
|
|247
|28
|49
|
|-
|Werkspoor
|31
|1901
|
|
|248
|27
|48
|
|-
|Werkspoor
|32
|1901
|
|
|249
|
|
|
|-
|Werkspoor
|33
|1901
|
|
|250
|
|
|
|-
|Werkspoor
|34
|1901
|
|
|251
|
|
|
|-
|Werkspoor
|35
|1901
|
|
|252
|
|
|
|-
|Werkspoor
|36
|1901
|
|
|253
|
|
|
|-
|Werkspoor
|37
|1901
|
|
|254
|
|
|
|-
|Werkspoor
|38
|1901
|
|
|255
|
|
|
|-
!colspan="9" style="text-align: left;" |Notes
|}

South African Railways
When the Union of South Africa was established on 31 May 1910, the three Colonial government railways (Cape Government Railways, Natal Government Railways and CSAR) were united under a single administration to control and administer the railways, ports and harbours of the Union. Although the South African Railways and Harbours came into existence in 1910, the actual classification and renumbering of all the rolling stock of the three constituent railways were only implemented with effect from 1 January 1912.

As a result of locomotive sales by the NZASM to the CFM before the war, wartime attrition and more sales by the CSAR to the CFM after the war, only 55 of the original 175 46 Tonner locomotives remained to be taken onto the SAR roster by 1910. They retained their Class B designation and their planned SAR number range was to be from 1 to 55. From the several gaps in the actual number sequence, it would appear that eleven of these locomotives were withdrawn or disposed of between 1910 and 1912. As a result, by the time the actual renumbering took place in 1912, only 44 of the locomotives remained to be taken onto the SAR roster.Classification of S.A.R. Engines with Renumbering Lists, issued by the Chief Mechanical Engineer's Office, Pretoria, January 1912, pp. 7, 13, 18-19 (Reprinted in April 1987 by SATS Museum, R.3125-6/9/11-1000)

In SAR service, the Class B was used as shunting engines in the Transvaal and the Orange Free State, and towards the end of their service lives also in the Western Cape. The last 46 Tonner was withdrawn from SAR service and scrapped during 1919, but several had earlier been sold to gold mining companies.

Industrial
Several Class B locomotives were sold to mines and other industries by the CFM, CSAR and SAR when they began to be withdrawn from government railways service. Some remained in industrial service well into the twentieth century. At least one, identified as ex NZASM no. 195 Evensen, later CFM no. 27, was purchased by the Randfontein Estates Gold Mine (REGM). Another saw service with Dunn's Locomotive Works in Witbank.SA Steam Overseas, Compiled by John Middleton, SA Rail July–August 1987, p. 105

Preservation
Four of the 46 Tonner locomotives are known to have survived.
 Esslingen-built SAR no. 19, NZASM no. 216 Beelaerts van Blockland, is at the James Hall Museum at Wemmer Pan in Johannesburg, restored as Consolidated Main Reef Mines & Estates no. 4.
 Esslingen-built SAR no. 41, NZASM no. 197 Kracht, is on display at the Outeniqua Transport Museum in George, restored incorrectly as NZASM no. 61 Roos and bearing the name President Kruger, which was the name carried by 40 Tonner no. 42 in the NZASM days.
 Esslingen-built SAR no. 44, NZASM no. 230 Jan Wintervogel'', was donated by ESKOM to the SAR for preservation in 1971 and was steamed occasionally in the Spoornet era for steam enthusiasts' specials, filming and other activities.
 Werkspoor-built SAR no. 47, unnamed NZASM no. 236, was plinthed on the concourse at Pretoria station, restored incorrectly as NZASM no. 242.

Illustration

References

1050
C2′ n2t locomotives
0-6-4T locomotives
Esslingen locomotives
Werkspoor locomotives
Cape gauge railway locomotives
Railway locomotives introduced in 1893
1893 in South Africa